Hadham railway station served the village of Much Hadham, Hertfordshire, England, from 1863 to 1965 on the Buntingford branch line.

History 
The station was opened on 3 July 1863 by the Great Eastern Railway. It was situated at the end of Station Road. On the up platform were the station buildings which incorporated a toilet and a waiting room. To the north of this platform was a signal box which controlled a loop and the goods yard. The station closed to passengers on 16 November 1964 and closed to goods on 20 September 1965. The station buildings and the station house were wrecked by vandals a few years after closure. They were eventually demolished after the parish council requested it.

References 

Disused railway stations in Hertfordshire
Former Great Eastern Railway stations
Railway stations in Great Britain opened in 1863
Railway stations in Great Britain closed in 1964
1863 establishments in England
1965 disestablishments in England
Beeching closures in England
Much Hadham